Nea Ionia (meaning New Ionia) is a northern suburb of Athens, Greece, and a municipality of the Attica region. It was named after Ionia, the region in Anatolia from which many Greeks migrated in the 1920s as a part of the Population exchange between Greece and Turkey. Many of the town families originated from the town of Alanya which is currently a part of Turkey.

Nea Ionia is 7 km northeast of Athens city centre. The municipality has an area of 4.421 km2.

History
In the past, the area was named Podarades after Greek Revolution Hero of Albanian origin Ziliftar Poda and his followers, settled in this area. The modern settlement was built after the Greco-Turkish War (1919-22) and the subsequent population exchange between Greece and Turkey in 1923.  The suburb developed rapidly thanks to carpet handicrafts. The refugees carried their expertise in Athens and opened important carpet handicrafts. This branch was the main economical source for the residents of Nea Ionia for many years. Nea Ionia gradually increases its population and was expanded in a large area. The suburb today comprises the districts of 13 neighborhoods: Nea Ionia (Center), Perissos, Inepoli, Pefkakia, Saframpoli, Neapoli, Eleftheroupoli, Alsoupoli, Kalogreza, Lazarou, Anthrakorihia, Irini, Omorfoklissia and Palaiologou.

Sports
Nea Ionia is the seat of the clubs O.F. Nea Ionia (Όμιλος Φιλάθλων Νέας Ιωνίας), club founded in 1926 with achievements in handball and Nea Ionia F.C. Other notable clubs are Eleftheroupoli F.C. with earlier presence in Beta Ethniki and DIKE.AS. Nea Ionia with current presence in A1 Ethniki handball. In the past there are also the important clubs PAO Saframpolis, PAO Kalogrezas and Ikaroi Neas Ionias which are inactive today.

Historical population

Notable people 
Maria Farantouri (1947-), Greek singer
Stelios Kazantzidis (1931–2001), Greek singer
Nikos Xanthopoulos (1934-), Greek actor
Taki Tsan (1979-), Greek rapper
Pantelis Pantelidis (1983-2016), Greek Singer
Giota Lydia (1934-), Greek Laïko singer
Markos Kalovelonis (1994-),Greek-Russian Tennis Player

See also
List of municipalities of Attica

References

External links
City of Nea Ionia official website 

1923 establishments in Greece
Populated places established in 1923
Municipalities of Attica
Populated places in North Athens (regional unit)